Seconda Divisione 1925–26 was the lower championship of the Lega Nord.

Different from the higher championship, it was structured on four local groups.

Regulations 
It had four groups of eleven clubs, twenty-two match days.

Under Lega Nord's reform project, four clubs in each group would pass to a new intermediate championship, while subsequent four clubs would remain in this tournament.

After the fascist takeover of the CONI and the FIGC in summer 1926, regulations changed at the end of the championship. Lega Nord was transformed into an appointed fascist committee, the Direttorio Divisioni Superiori. Six clubs in each group remained in the lower DDS championship, while to give space to Southern teams, the last five clubs were relegated.

Group A 
Biellese 29
Derthona 28
Atalanta 26
Pro Patria 26
US Milanese 23
Como 20
Juve Italia 19
Lecco 16
Fanfulla 15
Monza 12
Vercellesi Erranti 6

Juve Italia, Lecco, Fanfulla and Monza relegated. Vercellesi Erranti went bankrupt and disbanded.

Group B 
Spezia 26
Speranza 25
Sestrese 25
Astigiani 23
Savona 22
FIAT 22
Corniglianese 21
Valenzana 20
Rivarolese 16
Vado 13
Novese 7

Corniglianese, Valenzana, Rivarolese and Vado relegated. FIAT and Novese went bankrupt and disbanded.

Group C 
Spal 33
Lucchese 26
Prato 25
Libertas 25
Pistoiese 25
Carpi 18
Piacenza 17
Crema 16
Gonzaga 15
Viareggio 11
Trevigliese 8

Piacenza, Crema, Gonzaga, Viareggio and Trevigliese relegated.

Group D 
Venezia 27
Treviso 25
Olympia Fiume 23
Gloria Fiume 23
Monfalcone 20
Triestina 18
Pro Gorizia 18
Edera 18
Vicenza 18
Dolo 17
Petrarca 13

Pro Gorizia, Edera, Vicenza, Dolo and Petrarca relegated. Olympia Fiume and Gloria Fiume merged becoming US Fiumana.

References 

1925–26 in Italian football leagues
Serie B seasons